Physical abuse is any intentional act causing injury, trauma, bodily harm or other physical suffering to another person or animal by way of bodily contact. Physical abuse is a type of abuse that involves physical violence, such as hitting, kicking, pushing, biting, choking, throwing objects, and using weapons. Physical abuse also includes using restraints or confinement, such as tying someone up, locking them in a room, or restraining them with drugs or alcohol. Physical abuse can also include withholding basic needs, such as food, clothing, or medical care. In addition to the physical injuries caused by physical abuse, it can also lead to psychological trauma, such as fear, anxiety, depression, and post-traumatic stress disorder. Physical abuse can occur in any relationship, including those between family members, partners, and caregivers. It can also occur in institutional settings, such as nursing homes, schools, and prisons. Physical abuse can have long-term physical, psychological, and social consequences, and can even be fatal.

Physical abuse is also said to be a type of abuse that involves the use of physical force against a person or animal. This is done in order to cause physical pain, injury, or other physical suffering. Physical abuse can involve hitting, kicking, punching, burning, or otherwise harming a person or animal. It can also include the use of weapons or other objects to cause harm. Physical abuse is a crime and should be reported to the authorities. It is important to remember that any kind of physical violence is unacceptable and should not be tolerated. In most cases, children are the victims of physical abuse, but adults can also be victims, as in cases of domestic violence or workplace aggression. Alternative terms sometimes used include physical assault or physical violence, and may also include sexual abuse. Physical abuse may involve more than one abuser, and more than one victim.

Causes

Abusive acts toward children can often result from parents' attempts at child discipline through excessive corporal punishment. A number of causes of physical abuse against children have been identified, the most common of which, according to Mash and Wolfe, being:
many abusive and neglectful parents have had little exposure to positive parental models and supports.
there is often a greater degree of stress in the family environment.
information-processing disturbances may cause maltreating parents to misperceive or mislabel their child's behavior, which leads to inappropriate responses.
there is often a lack of awareness or understanding of developmentally appropriate expectations.

Effects

Physically abused children are at risk for later interpersonal problems involving aggressive behavior, and adolescents are at a much greater risk for substance use disorders. In addition, symptoms of depression, emotional distress, and suicidal ideation are also common features of people who have been physically abused. Studies have also shown that children with a history of physical abuse may meet DSM-IV-TR criteria for post traumatic stress disorder (PTSD). As many as one-third of children who experience physical abuse are also at risk to become abusive as adults

Researchers have pointed to other potential psycho-biological effects of child physical abuse on parenting, when abused children become adults. These recent findings may, at least in part, be carried forward by epigenetic changes that impact the regulation of stress physiology. Many other potentially important consequences of childhood physical abuse on adolescent and adult physical and mental health and development have been documented via the Adverse Childhood Experiences (ACE) studies.

Treatment

Seeking treatment is unlikely for a majority of people that are physically abused, and the ones who are seeking treatment are usually under some form of legal constraint. The prevention and treatment options for physically abused children include: enhancing positive experiences early in the development of the parent-child relationship, as well as changing how parents teach, discipline, and attend to their children.

Evidence-based interventions include cognitive behavioral therapy (CBT) as well as video-feedback interventions and child-parent psychodynamic psychotherapy; all of which specifically target anger patterns and distorted beliefs, and offer training and/or reflection, support, and modelling that focuses on parenting skills and expectations, as well as increasing empathy for the child by supporting the parent's taking the child's perspective.

These forms of treatment may include training in social competence and management of daily demands in an effort to decrease parental stress, which is a known risk factor for physical abuse. Although these treatment and prevention strategies are to help children and parents of children who have been abused, some of these methods can also be applied to adults who have physically abused.

Other animals

Physical abuse has also been observed among Adélie penguins in Antarctica.

Forms

References

External links 

 

Abuse
Bullying
Effects of external causes
Violence
Acute pain